Kathleen Hoey Lavoie (September 28, 1949 – May 23, 2022) was an American microbiologist and explorer who was Professor of Biological Sciences at the State University of New York at Plattsburgh. Lavoie was a Fellow of the National Speleological Society and the Cave Research Foundation. She was a specialist in biospeleology, and, in particular, the Mammoth Cave National Park in Kentucky.

Early life and education 
Lavoie was an undergraduate student at the University of New Hampshire. She graduated in 1972 and moved to Indiana University Bloomington, where she worked toward a master's degree in microbiology. Lavoie joined the University of Illinois at Chicago Circle for doctoral research, where she investigated the decomposition of cave rat dung. After earning her doctorate, she joined the faculty at the University of Michigan–Flint.

Research and career 
In 1997, Lavoie joined State University of New York at Plattsburgh (SUNY Plattsburgh) as Dean of Arts and Sciences.

Lavoie was an expert and a fan of bats. According to the State University of New York, the shelves in her office were full of stuffed animal versions of bats. Lavoie led several research tips to caves, including the Mammoth Cave National Park in Kentucky. The cave contains several hundred miles of passages. On such visits, Lavoie studied the terrestrial ecosystems. This involved counting the number of Hadenoecus subterraneus, which can be used to estimate the health of the cave. To fairly evaluate the number of crickets, she divided the cave into sections. She also explored the Carlsbad Caverns National Park and Cueva de Villa Luz. The Cueva de Villa Luz is rich in hydrogen sulfide and smells of rotten eggs. Lavoie appeared in the 2004 National Geographic television program Amazing Caves.

Lavoie stepped down as Dean of the Faculty of Arts and Sciences at SUNY Plattsburgh in 2012. She was awarded the Chancellor's Award for Excellence in Scholarship and Creative Activities in 2017.

Personal life 
Lavoie died in May 2022 after attending an orchestra recital in Peru, New York.

Selected publications

References 

1949 births
2022 deaths
University of New Hampshire alumni
Indiana University Bloomington alumni
University of Illinois Chicago alumni
State University of New York at Plattsburgh faculty
American microbiologists
American women scientists